Croatian Political Science Review (literal translation: Political Thought) is the oldest academic journal published by the Faculty of Political Science of the University of Zagreb in Croatia. Its one of the leading interdisciplinary social sciences journals in Croatia and in the countries of the former Socialist Federal Republic of Yugoslavia. Croatian Political Science Review is published quarterly in Croatian and an annual English edition has been published since 1992. The journal was established in 1964 and its articles are regularly available in Academic Search Complete, Political Science Complete, SocINDEX, Central and Eastern European Online Library, ProQuest, Directory of Open Access Journals, Portal of scientific journals of Croatia and other platforms.

According to SCImago Journal Rank the Croatian Political Science Review was Q1 best quartile journal in the field of History in 2018. It was the sixth highest ranked political science and international relations journal in the entire Eastern Europe and 257th internationally among 503 ranked journals. In the field of History it was 10th among 109 ranked journals in Eastern Europe and 278th among 1217 ranked journals internationally.

See also 
 List of political science journals

References

External links 

Previous Issues at the Portal of scientific journals of Croatia
Previous English-language issues: 2019, 2018, 2017, 2016, 2015, 2014, 2013, 2012, 2011, 2010, 2009, 2008, 2007, 2006, 2005, 2004, 2003, 2002, 2001, 2000, 1999, 1998, 1997, 1996, 1995, 1993

Political science journals
Quarterly journals
1964 establishments in Croatia
English-language journals
Croatian-language journals
Publications established in 1964
Academia in Croatia
Academic journals of Croatia
University of Zagreb
Open access journals